The Admiralty buildings complex lies between Whitehall, Horse Guards Parade and The Mall and includes five inter-connected buildings. 

Since the Admiralty no longer exists as a department, these buildings are now used by separate government departments:

The Admiralty

The oldest building was long known simply as The Admiralty; it is now known officially as the Ripley Building, a three-storey U-shaped brick building designed by Thomas Ripley and completed in 1726. Alexander Pope implied that the architecture is rather dull, lacking either the vigour of the Baroque style, fading from fashion at the time, or the austere grandeur of the Palladian style just coming into vogue. It is mainly notable for being perhaps the first purpose-built office building in Great Britain. It contained the Admiralty board room, which is still used by the Admiralty, other state rooms, offices and apartments for the Lords of the Admiralty. Robert Adam designed the screen, which was added to the entrance front in 1788. The Ripley Building is currently occupied by the International Development section of the Foreign, Commonwealth and Development Office.

Admiralty House
Admiralty House is a moderately proportioned mansion to the south of the Ripley Building, designed by Samuel Pepys Cockerell and built in the late 18th century as the residence of the First Lord of the Admiralty in 1788. Winston Churchill was one of its occupants in 1911–1915 and 1939–1940. It lacks its own entrance from Whitehall and is entered through the Ripley Courtyard or Ripley Building. It is a three-storey building in yellow brick with neoclassical interiors. The ground floor comprises meeting rooms for the Cabinet Office and the upper floors are three ministerial residences.

There was formerly also an Admiralty House located at, or near to, the main base and dockyard in each station of the Royal Navy for use of the Commander-in-Chief. Each property was designated as the Admiralty House named for its location, but often possessed a property name (similarly to stone frigates being commissioned with a name distinct from their functional designations, such as HMS Malabar, functionally Her Majesty's Naval Base, Bermuda, which closed in 1995).

The Commander-in-Chief of the station used the Admiralty House when based ashore, but was otherwise based afloat aboard the flagship of the squadron. There may have been more than one Admiralty House per station, as with the North America Station (later the North America and West Indies Station, and finally the America and West Indies Station), the squadron of which was for a time based in Bermuda during the winter months and Halifax, Nova Scotia, during the summers, before Bermuda became the year-round headquarters. Former Admiralty Houses would cease to have that function, either being disposed of (if having been on Admiralty property) or re-purposed as separate stations were merged, such as the Jamaica Station being merged with the North America Station to create the North America and West Indies Station.

Other Admiralty Houses or former Admiralty Houses include:
Admiralty House, Bermuda (successively Rose Hill, Mount Wyndham, and St. John's Hill, which was re-named Clarence Hill)
Admiralty House, English Harbour, Antigua, Leeward Islands (now housing Nelson's Dockyard Museum).
Admiralty House, Halifax, Nova Scotia, Canada (now the Naval Museum of Halifax)
Admiralty House, Hong Kong (Marble Hall)
Admiralty House, Malta
Admiralty House, Mount Wise, Devonport, Plymouth, England (Hamoaze House)
Admiralty House, Mount Wise, Devonport, Plymouth, England (formerly Government House)
Admiralty House, Port Royal, Jamaica
Admiralty House, Singapore
Admiralty House, Sydney, New South Wales, Australia
Admiralty House, Trincomalee, Ceylon

There are two former naval properties today known as Admiralty House, though it is unclear whether they were ever so designated by the Admiralty, or ever served that function:

Admiralty House, Mount Pearl, Newfoundland (a former wireless station.)
Admiralty House, Gibraltar (Built in 1741. A hospital from 1746 to 1922. Accommodation for naval and military medical staff and families, and an occasional prison for prisoners-of-war).

Admiralty Extension

This is the largest of the Admiralty Buildings. It was begun in the late 19th century and redesigned while the construction was in progress to accommodate the extra offices needed by the naval arms race with the German Empire. It is a red brick building with white stone, detailing in the Queen Anne style with French influences. It has been used by the Foreign and Commonwealth Office from the 1960s to 2016. The Department for Education planned to move into the building in September 2017 following the Foreign and Commonwealth Office's decision to leave the building and consolidate its London staff into one building on King Charles Street. A change of contractor (BAM was replaced by Willmott Dixon) then delayed consolidation of the Department for Education to autumn 2018. In 2021, the building became the home of the Department for International Trade.

Admiralty Arch

Admiralty Arch is linked to the Old Admiralty Building by a bridge and is part of the ceremonial route from Trafalgar Square to Buckingham Palace.  In 2012, HM Government sold the building on a 125-year lease for £60m for a proposed redevelopment into a Waldorf Astoria luxury hotel and four apartments.

The Admiralty Citadel

The Admiralty Citadel is a squat, windowless Second World War fortress north west of Horse Guards Parade, now covered in ivy.

Further reading
  Bradley, Simon, and Nikolaus Pevsner. London 6: Westminster (from the Buildings of England series). New Haven, Connecticut: Yale University Press, 2003. .
 C. Hussey, "Admiralty Building, Whitehall", Country Life, 17 and 24 November 1923, pp. 684–692, 718–726.

References

External links
 The Admiralty at the Survey of London online

Admiralty
History of the Royal Navy